Dagmar Kuzmanová (born 17 September 1956) is a Slovak alpine skier. She competed in three events at the 1976 Winter Olympics.

References

External links
 

1956 births
Living people
Slovak female alpine skiers
Olympic alpine skiers of Czechoslovakia
Alpine skiers at the 1976 Winter Olympics
People from Handlová
Sportspeople from the Trenčín Region
Universiade gold medalists for Czechoslovakia
Universiade medalists in alpine skiing
Competitors at the 1978 Winter Universiade